Ahlm is a surname. Notable people with the surname include:

Gerda Ahlm (1869–1956), Swedish artist and art conservator
Johanna Ahlm (born 1987), Swedish handball player
Marcus Ahlm (born 1978), Swedish handball player

See also
Alm (surname)

Swedish-language surnames